Choápam Zapotec (Zapoteco de Choápam; in Veracruz Zapoteco de San Juan Comaltepec) is a Zapotec language of Oaxaca, Mexico.

Phonology

Consonants

 [x] occurs as an allophone of [k]
 [r] has the voiceless allophone [ṛ] when in a nasal segment (e.g. rná1baˀ2 [ṛnábaˀ] (I ask))
 The pronunciation of [r] is variable, sometimes pronounced as apico-alveolar and with one to several flaps, with one being the most common.

Vowels

[i], [e], [ɛ], [o], [u], [a]

The vowels [i], [u], [a], [e] and [ɛ] are nasalised when followed by 'n' at the end of a word.

Tones
Choapam Zapotec has three pitches, or tones, which are high, mid, and low, indicated respectively by [3] (superscript 3), [2] (superscript 2), and [1] (superscript 1), written after each syllable.

References

Zapotec languages

Languages of Mexico
Oto-Manguean languages